Conversation theory is a cybernetic approach to the study of conversation, cognition and learning that may occur between two participants who are engaged in conversation with each other. It presents an experimental framework heavily utilising human-computer interactions and computer theoretic models as a means to present a scientific theory explaining how conversational interactions lead to the emergence of knowledge between participants. The theory was developed by Gordon Pask, who credits Bernard Scott, Dionysius Kallikourdis, Brian Lewis and others during its initial development and implementation as well as Paul Pangaro during subsequent years.

Overview 
Conversation theory may be described as a formal theory of conversational process. It may be viewed as a framework that may be used to examine learning and development through the means of conversational techniques by means of human-machine interactions; the results of which may then inform approaches to education, educational psychology, and epistemology. The theory has been noted to have been influenced by a variety of psychological, pedagogical and philosophical influences such as Lev Vygotsky, R. D. Laing and George H. Mead.

The theory prioritizes learning and teaching approaches related to education. A central idea of the theory is that learning occurs through conversations: For if participant A is to be conscious with participant B of a topic of inquiry, both participants must be able to converse with each other about that topic. Because of this, participants engaging in a discussion about a subject matter make their knowledge claims explicit through the means of such conversational interactions.

The theory is concerned with a variety of "psychological, linguistic, epistemological, social or non-commitally mental events of which there is awareness". Awareness in this sense is not of a person-specific type, i.e., it is not necessarily localized in a single participant. Instead, the type of awareness examined in conversation theory is the kind of joint awareness that may be shared between entities. While there is an acknowledgement of its similarities to phenomenology, the theory extends its analysis to examine cognitive processes. However, the concept of cognition is not viewed as merely being confined to an individual's brain or central nervous system. Instead, cognition may occur at the level of a group of people (leading to the emergence of social awareness), or may characterize certain types of computing machines.

Initial results from the theory lead to a distinction in the type of learning strategies participants used during the learning process; whereby students in general gravitated towards holistic or serialist learning strategies (with the optimal mixture producing a versatile learning strategy).

Conversation 
Following Hugh Dubberly and Paul Pangaro, a conversation in the context of conversation theory involves an exchange between two participants whereby each participant is contextualised as a learning system whose internal states are changed through the course of the conversation. Conversation is distinguished from the mere exchange of information as seen in information theory, by the fact that utterances are interpreted within the context of a given perspective of such a learning system. Each participant's meanings and perceptions change during the course of a conversation, and each participant can agree to commit to act in certain ways during the conversation. In this way, conversation permits not only learning but also collaboration through participants coordinating themselves and designating their roles through the means of conversation. Since meanings are agreed during the course of a conversation, and since purported agreements can be illusory (whereby we think we have the same understanding of a given topic but in fact do not), a empirical approach to the study of conversation would require stable reference points during such conversational exchanges between peers so as to permit reproducible results. Using computer theoretic models of cognition, conversation theory can document these intervals of understanding which arise in the conversations between two participating individuals, such that the development of individual and collective understandings can be analysed rigorously.

Language 
The types of languages that conversation theory utilises in its approach are distinguishable based on a language's role in relation to an experiment in which a conversation is examined as the subject of inquiry; thus, it follows that conversations can be conducted at different levels depending on the role a language has in relation to an experiment. The types of languages are as follows: Natural languages used for general discussions outside the experiment; object languages which are the subject of inquiry during an experiment, and finally a metalanguage which is used to talk about the design, management, and results on an experiment.

A natural language  is treated as an unrestricted language used between a source (say a participant) and an interrogator or analyst (say an experimenter).
For this reason, it may be considered a language for general discussion in the context of conversation theory.
An object language  meanwhile, has some of the qualities of a natural language (which permits commands, questions, ostentation and predication), but is used in conversation theory specifically as the language studied during experiments. Finally, the metalanguage  is an observational language used by an interrogator or analysis for describing the conversational system under observation, prescribing actions that are permitted within such a system, and posing parameters regarding what may be discussed during an experiment under observation.

The object language  differs from most formal languages, by virtue of being "a command and question language[,] not an assertoric language like [a] predicate calculus". Moreover,  is a language primarily dealing with metaphors indicating material analogies and not on the kind of propositions dealing with truth or falsity values. Since conversation theory specifically focuses on learning and development within human subjects, the object language is separated into two distinct modes of conversing.

According to Bernard Scott,  discourse of an object language  may be conceptualised as the level of how, i.e., discourse that is concerned with "how to “do” a topic: how to recognise it, construct it, maintain it and so on".
Meanwhile,  discourse may be conceptualised as the level of why, i.e., it is discourse "concerned with explaining or justifying what a topic means in terms of other topics".

Entailment Structures 
Such products found at  that are said to be emergent through conversational interactions are encapsulated in entailment structures, which a way by which we may visualise an organized and publicly available collection of resultant knowledge. The entailment structure is compoused of a series of nodes and arrows representing a series of topic relations and the derivations of such topic relations. For example:

Represents an entailment structure showing the derivation of a topic from two prexisting topics. Assuming we use the same derivation process for all topics in above entailment structure, then we are let with the following product:

Which represents a minimal entailment mesh consisting of one relation with a triad of derivations. The solid arc indicates that a given head topic relation is derived from subordinate topics, whereas the arcs with dotted lines represent how the head topic may be used to derive other topics. Finally:

Represents two solid arcs permiting alternative derivations of the topic T. Entailment structures may afford certain advantages over semantic networks and other, less formalized and non-experimentally based "representations of knowledge".

Analogy 
Lastly, a formal analogy is shown where the derivations of the concept triples are indicated. The diamond shape denotes analogy and can exist between any three topics because of the shared meanings and differences.

The relation of one topic to another by an analogy can also be seen as a restriction on a mapping and a distinction to produce the second topic or concept.

Cognitive Reflector 
From conversation theory, Pask developed what he called a "Cognitive Reflector". This is a virtual machine for selecting and executing concepts or topics from an entailment mesh shared by at least a pair of participants. It features an external modelling facility on which agreement between, say, a teacher and pupil may be shown by reproducing public descriptions of behaviour. We see this in essay and report writing or the "practicals" of science teaching.

Lp was Pask's protolanguage which produced operators like Ap which concurrently executes the concept, Con, of a Topic, T, to produce a Description, D. Thus:

Ap(Con(T)) => D(T), where => stands for produces.

A succinct account of these operators is presented in Pask Amongst many insights he points out that three indexes are required for concurrent execution, two for parallel and one to designate a serial process. He subsumes this complexity by designating participants A, B, etc.

In Commentary toward the end of Pask, he states:

 The form not the content of the theories (conversation theory and interactions of actors theory) return to and is congruent with the forms of physical theories; such as wave particle duality (the set theoretic unfoldment part of conversation theory is a radiation and its reception is the interpretation by the recipient of the descriptions so exchanged, and vice versa). The particle aspect is the recompilation by the listener of what a speaker is saying. Theories of many universes, one at least for each participant A and one to participant B- are bridged by analogy. As before this is the truth value of any interaction; the metaphor for which is culture itself.

Learning strategies 
In order to facilitate learning, Pask argued that subject matter should be represented in the form of structures which show what is to be learned.  These structures exist in a variety of different levels depending upon the extent of the relationships displayed.  The critical method of learning according to Conversation Theory is "teachback" in which one person teaches another what they have learned.

Pask identified two different types of learning strategies:
 Serialists – Progress through a structure in a sequential fashion
 Holists – Look for higher order relations

The ideal is the versatile learner who is neither vacuous holist "globe trotter" nor serialist who knows little of the context of his work.

In learning, the stage where one converges or evolves, many Cyberneticians describe the act of understanding as a closed-loop. Instead of simply “taking in” new information, one goes back to look at their understandings and pulls together information that was “triggered” and forms a new connection. This connection becomes tighter and one's understanding of a certain concept is solidified or “stable” (Pangaro, 2003). Furthermore, Gordon Pask emphasized that conflict is the basis for the notion of “calling for'' additional information (Pangaro, 1992).

According to Entwistle, experiments which lead to the investigation of phenomenon later denoted by the term learning strategy came about through the implementation of a variety of learning tasks. Initially, this was done through utilising either CASTE, INTUITION, or the Clobbits pseudo-taxonomy. However, given issues resulting from either the time-consuming nature or operating experiments or inexactness of experimental conditions, new tests were created in the form of the Spy Ring History test and the Smuggler's test. The former test involved a participant having to learn the history of a fictitious spy ring (in other words, the history of a fictitious espionage network); the participant, having to learn about the history of five spies in three countries over the period of five years. The comprehension learning component of the test involved learning the similarities and differences between a set of networks; whereas the operation learning aspect of the test involved learning the role each spy played and what sequence of actions that spy played over a given year.

While Entwistle noted difficultes regarding the length of such tests for groups of students who were engaged in the Spy Ring History test, the results of the test did seem to correspond with the type of learning stratigies discussed. However, it has been noted that while Pask and associates work on learning styles has been influential in both the development of conceptual tools and methodology, the Spy Ring History test and Smuggler's test may have been biased towards STEM students than humanities in its implementation, with Entwistle arguing that the "rote learning of formulae and definitions, together with a positive reaction to solving puzzles and problems of a logical nature, are characteristics more commonly found in science than arts student".

Gallery

See also 
 Conversational constraints theory
 
 
 Integrative learning
 Text and conversation theory

References

Further reading 
 Ranulph Glanville and Karl H. Muller (eds.), Gordon Pask, Philosopher Mechanic- An Introduction to the Cybernetician's Cybernetician edition echoraum 2007 
 Aleksej Heinze, Chris Procter, "Use of conversation theory to underpin blended learning", in: International Journal of Teaching and Case Studies (2007) – Vol. 1, No.1/2 pp. 108 – 120
 W. R. Klemm, Software Issues for Applying Conversation Theory For Effective Collaboration Via the Internet, Manuscript 2002.
 Gordon Pask, Conversation, cognition and learning. New York: Elsevier, 1975.
 Gordon Pask, The Cybernetics of Human Learning and Performance, Hutchinson. 1975
 Gordon Pask, Conversation Theory, Applications in Education and Epistemology, Elsevier, 1976.
 Gordon Pask, Heinz von Foerster's Self-Organisation, the Progenitor of Conversation and Interaction Theories, 1996.
 Scott, B. (ed. and commentary) (2011). "Gordon Pask: The Cybernetics of Self-Organisation, Learning and Evolution Papers 1960-1972" pp 648 Edition Echoraum (2011).

External links 
PDFs of Pask's books and key papers at pangaro.com
 Conversation Theory – Gordon Pask overview from web.cortland.edu.
 Cybernetics And Conversation by Paul Pangaro, 1994–2000.
 Conversation Theory: Reasoning about significance and mutuality by Mike Martin and John Dobson,
 Conversation Theory developed by the cybernetician Gordon Pask by Yitzhak I. Hayut-Man ea, 1995.

Oral communication
Management cybernetics